San Miguel Field is located in Cotuí, the capital of the Sánchez Ramírez province in the Dominican Republic. It serves as a simple runway only for emergency landings and to support other operations at Angelina Airport.

References

External links 
 

Airports in the Dominican Republic
Cotuí
Buildings and structures in Sánchez Ramírez Province